Glyn Sheridan Burgess is a British scholar of medieval language and literature, Emeritus Professor at the University of Liverpool. He has published on Marie de France, besides other topics, and is the translator of the Penguin edition of the Lays of Marie de France and the Song of Roland. He was awarded a knighthood in the Ordre des Palmes Académiques in 1998.

Selected publications and translations
The Voyage of Saint Brendan: Representative Versions of the Legend in English Translation by W. R. J. Barron, Glyn S. Burgess (2004)
Roman de Rou (2004)
Marie de France: An Analytical Bibliography, Supplement N° 2 (2000)
The Lays of Marie de France: Texts and Contexts (1987)

References

External links
Glyn Burgess at University of Liverpool

Living people
Chevaliers of the Ordre des Palmes Académiques
Year of birth missing (living people)